"Hard Times" is a song written by Bobby Braddock, and recorded by American country music artist Lacy J. Dalton.  It was released in August 1980 as the first single and title track from the album Hard Times.  The song reached number 7 on the Billboard Hot Country Singles & Tracks chart.

Chart performance

References

1980 singles
Lacy J. Dalton songs
Songs written by Bobby Braddock
Song recordings produced by Billy Sherrill
Columbia Records singles
1980 songs